Robert Lopez (born 1971) is an American writer of novels and short stories, who lives in Brooklyn, New York. His fiction has appeared in many journals, including Bomb, The Threepenny Review, Vice Magazine, New England Review, New Orleans Review, American Reader, Brooklyn Rail, Hobart, Indiana Review, Literarian, Nerve, New York Tyrant, and Norton Anthology of International Flash Fiction. He teaches at The New School, Pratt Institute, Columbia University, and Pine Manor College. He was co-editor of avant-literary magazine Sleepingfish. In 2010, he was awarded a Fellow in Fiction from the New York Foundation for the Arts, which included a grant for a three-year period.

He started a blog to have a single site for information about his work but was averse to frequent blog posts. He was posting daily No News Today, but then decided to invite friends and colleagues to post. It has since been replaced with www.robertlopez.net

Approach to writing 
In an interview with author Peter Markus Lopez said of his writing, I don’t think about the reader at all when I work. Indeed, the only reader I’m concerned with is myself. I suppose if I can entertain myself, then there might be a few others out there in the world who might be likewise entertained. I would like to find more of those readers, certainly. Some readers find these stories dark and depressing, but that is not how I find them at all. Almost all of the stories make me laugh. As a reader, I want to be entertained, and I want to be compelled. I want to get the wind knocked out of me. This impact can only happen through language. I don’t care about the story, the goings-on: only how they are told.

Publications

Novels 
 Part of the World (2007) Calamari Press,       
 Kamby Bolongo Mean River (2009) Dzanc Books,   
 All Back Full (2017) Dzanc Books,

Short stories 
 Asunder (2010) Dzanc Books,  
 Good People (2016) Bellevue Literary Press,

External links 
 
 Interview with Robert Lopez in Big Other

References 

American male writers
1971 births
Living people